A.S. Roma dropped off the pace of the top teams during the 1986–87 season, which ended Sven-Göran Eriksson's first Italian employment prematurely. From being the top scoring team in the season before, Roma struggled with finding the back of the net, resulting in worsened results.

Squad

Goalkeepers
  Attilio Gregori
  Franco Tancredi

Defenders
  Marco Baroni
  Manuel Gerolin
  Settimio Lucci
  Paolo Mastrantonio
  Sebastiano Nela
  Emidio Oddi
  Ubaldo Righetti

Midfielders
  Carlo Ancelotti
  Klaus Berggreen
  Zbigniew Boniek
  Bruno Conti
  Stefano Desideri
  Antonio Di Carlo
  Giuseppe Giannini
  Stefano Impallomeni

Attackers
  Roberto Pruzzo
  Massimo Agostini
  Paolo Baldieri

Competitions

Serie A

League table

Matches

Topscorers
  Klaus Berggreen 5
  Stefano Desideri 5 (2)
  Massimo Agostini 4
  Zbigniew Boniek 4 (1)
  Roberto Pruzzo 4
  Francesco Baldieri 3
  Giuseppe Giannini 3 (1)
  Sebastiano Nela 3

Coppa Italia

Results

Round of 16

UEFA Cup Winners' Cup

First round

References

A.S. Roma seasons
Roma